Toshiya is a masculine Japanese given name.

Possible writings
Toshiya can be written using different combinations of kanji characters. Here are some examples:

敏也, "agile, to be"
敏矢, "agile, arrow"
敏哉, "agile, how (interrogative particle)"
敏八, "agile, eight"
敏弥, "agile, 	more and more"
俊也, "talented, to be"
俊矢, "talented, arrow"
俊哉, "talented, how (interrogative particle)"
俊八, "talented, eight"
俊弥, "talented, more and more"
利也, "benefit, to be"
利矢, "benefit, arrow"
利哉, "benefit, how (interrogative particle)"
寿也, "long life, to be"
寿矢, "long life, arrow"
寿哉, "long life, how (interrogative particle)"
年也, "year, to be"
年矢, "year, arrow"
年哉, "year, divination"

The name can also be written in hiragana としや or katakana トシヤ.

Notable people with the name
Toshiya Adachi (安達 俊也, born 1965), Japanese baseball player.
Toshiya Fujita (藤田 俊哉, born 1971), Japanese professional footballer.
Toshiya Fujita (director) (藤田 敏八, 1932–1997), Japanese actor, writer and director.
Toshiya Imamura (今村 俊也, born 1966), professional Go player.
Toshiya Okabe (岡部 俊哉, born 1959), Japanese Ground Self-Defense Force officer.
Toshiya Onoda (小野田 稔也, born 1970), Japanese bobsledder.
Toshiya Sueyoshi (末吉 隼也, born 1987), Japanese footballer.
Toshiya Sugiuchi (杉内 俊哉, born 1980), Japanese baseball player.
Toshiya Tojo (東城 利哉, born 1992), Japanese footballer.
Toshiya Ueda (上田 敏也, 1933–2022), a Japanese voice actor.
Toshiya (born 1977), bassist of the band Dir en Grey.

See also
Tōshiya, a Japanese archery contest

Japanese masculine given names